Lee Jae-An  (born 21 June 1988) is a South Korean footballer who plays as forward for Suwon FC in the K League 2.

Club career 
Lee was among FC Seoul's picks from the 2011 draft intake, and made his professional debut on 2 March 2011 as a late substitute in Seoul's 2011 Asian Champions League group match win over Al Ain. On 19 January 2012, he was traded to Gyeongnam FC for defender Kim Joo-Young.

Club career statistics

References

External links 

1988 births
Living people
Association football forwards
South Korean footballers
FC Seoul players
Gyeongnam FC players
Seoul E-Land FC players
Suwon FC players
Asan Mugunghwa FC players
K League 1 players
K League 2 players